Dimorphothrips is a genus of thrips in the family Phlaeothripidae.

Species
 Dimorphothrips idoliceps
 Dimorphothrips microchaetus

References

Phlaeothripidae
Thrips
Thrips genera